Josippon ( Sefer Yosipon) is a chronicle of Jewish history from Adam to the age of Titus. It is named after its supposed author, Josephus Flavius, though it was actually composed in the 10th century in Southern Italy. The Ethiopic version of Josippon is recognized as canonical by the Ethiopian Orthodox Tewahedo Church and the Eritrean Orthodox Tewahedo Church.

History
The Sefer Josippon was compiled in Hebrew early in the 10th century by a Jewish native of the Greek speaking Jewish community of the Catepanate of Italy in Southern Italy, which was at that time part of the Byzantine Empire. Later Judah Leon ben Moses Mosconi, a Romaniote Jew from Achrida edited and expanded the Sefer Josippon. The first edition was printed in Mantua in 1476. The book subsequently appeared in many forms, one of the most popular being in Yiddish, with quaint illustrations. Though the chronicle is more legendary than historical, it is not unlikely that ancient sources were used by the first compiler. The book enjoyed great popularity in England. In 1558, Peter Morvyn translated an abbreviated version into English, and edition after edition was called for. Lucien Wolf has shown that the English translations of the Bible aroused so much interest in the Jews that there was a widespread desire to know more about them. This led to the circulation of many editions of Josippon, which thus formed a link in the chain of events which culminated in the readmission of the Jews to England by Oliver Cromwell. As the Muslim writer ibn Hazm (d. 1063) was acquainted with the Arabic translation by a Yemenite Jew, Daniel Chwolson proposes that the author lived at the beginning of the 9th century.

The anonymous author of the work writes that he is copying from the writings of the old Jewish-Roman historian Josephus Flavius, whom the author calls Joseph ben Gorion. The name "Joseph" is given the Greek ending "on", resulting in the book's title "Josephon," "Joseppon," or "Josippon".

His Arabic name "Yusibus" is, according to Wellhausen, identical with "Hegesippus"). A gloss gives the form from the Italian, "Giuseppe." Trieber held the singular view that the author lived in the 4th century, and derived much of his material from Hegesippus.

Content 
Commencing with Adam and the geographical conditions of the first millennium BCE, the author passes to the legendary history of Rome and Babylon, to the accounts of Daniel, Zerubbabel (according to the Apocrypha), the Second Temple, and Cyrus the Great, and to the histories of Alexander the Great and his successors. He then gives the history of the Jews down to the destruction of the Temple. The last part contains, among other things, a brief history of Hannibal and an account of the coronation of an emperor, which, according to Basnage refers to that of Otto I, Holy Roman Emperor (crowned 962); this would be the only and a most valuable source of information concerning this event. If Basnage's conjecture is correct, the date of the composition of the "Yosippon" may be placed at the end of the 10th century. "Yosippon" is written in comparatively pure Biblical Hebrew, shows a predilection for certain Biblical phrases and archaisms, and is rich in poetical passages and in maxims and philosophical speculations.

Value as a historical source
"Yosippon" was much read and was highly respected as a historical source by the Jews of the Middle Ages. Joseph Justus Scaliger in his "Elenchus Trihæresii Nicolai Serarii" was the first to doubt its worth; Jan Drusius (d. 1609) held it to be historically valueless on account of its many chronological mistakes; Zunz and Delitzsch have branded the author as an impostor. In fact, both the manuscripts and printed editions are full of historical errors, misconceptions of its sources, and extravagant outbursts of vanity on the part of the author. But there is scarcely any book in Jewish literature that has undergone more changes at the hands of copyists and compilers; Judah ibn Moskoni knew of no less than four different compilations or abridgments. The later printed editions are one-third larger than the editio princeps of Mantua.

Evolution of the title
It was perhaps due to Jerahmeel ben Solomon that the work received its traditional title "Yosippon." He supplemented his copy from Josephus, whom he designates as "the great Joseph." The original title of the work, according to Trieber, was probably "History of Jerusalem", or, as a manuscript suggests, "History and Wars of the Jews." It is quoted in the Hebrew-Persian dictionary of Solomon ben Samuel (14th century), under the title "History of the Second Temple."

Literary criticism
Sebastian Münster's edition omits as not genuine the legendary introduction with its genealogical list, and also ch. lxvii. to the end, narrating Vespasian and Titus' expedition against Jerusalem. Azariah dei Rossi also recognized that the Alexander Romance of Pseudo-Callisthenes in a Hebrew translation had been smuggled into the first edition; and, following David Kimchi, Rapoport showed that the last chapter belonged to Abraham ibn Daud. Zunz has shown many other portions of the work to be Spanish additions, made in the twelfth century. Almost the whole account of Alexander the Great and his successors has been proved by Trieber to be of later origin. According to that critic, the part of the work original with its author ended with ch. lv. (the dedication of Herod's Temple), more or less of the remainder being taken from Pseudo-Hegesippus, and perhaps added as early as the 5th century. This would explain the numerous contradictions and style-differences between these two parts.

There remains, as the nucleus of the whole chronicle, a history of the Second Temple, beginning with the apocryphal stories concerning Daniel, Zerubbabel, etc., and finishing with the restoration of the Temple under Herod. A copyist of Pseudo-Hegesippus, however, identified the "Joseph ben Gorion" (Josephum Gorione Genitum), a prefect of Jerusalem, mentioned in iii. 3, 2 et seq., with the historian Josephus ben Mattithiah, at this time governor of the troops in Galilee. This may account for the fact that the chronicle was ascribed to Joseph b. Gorion.

Julius Wellhausen, agreeing with Trieber, denies that the genuine part has any historical value whatever. Trieber contends that the author did not draw his information directly from Josephus or from the Second Book of Maccabees, as is usually believed, and as Wellhausen maintains. He believes that both II Maccabees and the "Yosippon" used the work of Jason of Cyrene, and Josephus and the "Yosippon" that of Nicholas of Damascus.

The book emphasized national pride rather than religious devotion. It was the first time that the biblical phrase "like sheep to the slaughter" was inverted and used in opposition to pacifist martyrdom: contrary to previous accounts, Matityahu was credited as having said, "Be strong and let us be strengthened and let us die fighting and not die as sheep led to the slaughter" during the Maccabean Revolt.

Editions
The first edition of the "Yosippon" was published in Mantua by Abraham Conat (1476–79), who also wrote a preface to it. Other editions are:
Constantinople, 1510; arranged and enlarged, with a preface by Tam ibn Yahya ben David. It is borrowed to a great extent from that of Judah Leon ben Moses Mosconi (b. 1328), published in Otzar Ṭob, 1878, i. 017 et seq. The text in this edition is divided into ninety-seven chapters.
Basel, 1541; with a Latin preface, and a translation from the text of the editio princeps, by Sebastian Münster. The edition, however, contains only chapters iv. to lxiii.; the remaining chapters have been translated into Latin by David Kyberus (Historia Belli Judaici, in De la Bigne's "Bibliotheca Patrum, Paris).
Venice, 1544; reprinted from the Constantinople edition, as were all the following editions.
Cracow, 1588 and 1599.
Frankfort-on-the-Main, 1689.
Gotha, 1707 and 1710; with Münster's preface and a Latin translation and notes by Friedrich Breithaupt. Other editions appeared at Amsterdam (1723), Prague (1784), Warsaw (1845 and 1871), Zhitomir (1851), and Lvov (1855).

Translations and compilations
A Yiddish translation with illustrations was published by Michael Adam (Zürich, 1546; Prague, 1607; Amsterdam, 1661); it was later revised by Menahem ben Solomon ha-Levi, and published under the title Keter Torah (Amsterdam, 1743). Another Latin translation, with Tam ibn Yahya's preface, was published by Joseph Gagnier (Oxford, 1706); a French translation of Kyberus' Latin supplement by F. de Belleforest was published in Gilbert Génébrard's French translation of Josephus (Paris, 1609). The oldest extant abstract was made in southern Italy, about 1150, by Jerahmeel ben Solomon and the translation of a portion by Moses Gaster. Another abstract, made in 1161 by Abraham ibn Daud and used as the third book of his Sefer Seder ha-Qabbalah was published (Mantua, 1513; Venice, 1545; Basel, 1580, etc.), with Münster's Latin translation, at Worms (1529) and Basel (1559).

An English translation of this abstract was made by Peter Morvyn (London, 1558, 1561, 1575, 1608). A Yiddish compendium by Edel bat Moses was published in Kraków in 1670; the oldest German extract, under the title "Joseppi Jüdische Historien" (author not known) is described in Wolf, "Bibl. Hebr." (iii. 389). Some short extracts, in German, are given in Joseph Zedner, Auswahl aus Hebräischen Schriftstellern (pp. 16 et seq.), and in Winter and Wünsche, Die Jüdische Litteratur. iii. 310 et seq.).

In November 2022, Steven B. Bowman is due to release his English translation of Sepher Yosippon, which is a translation of David Flusser's critical edition of the text. Moreover, in 2023 an English translation of Hayim Hominer's edition of Yosippon, as well as an English translation based on the critical edition of Murad Kamil's Ge'ez text, called Zena Ayhud, are being prepared for publishing.   

In the Arabic and Yemenite translations, the author is called "Yusuf ibn Qaryun."

References

Bibliography
David Flusser, ed., Sepher Josippon . The Josippon [Josephus Gorionides], 2 vols. Jerusalem, 1978,1980;
Shulamith Sela, "Josippon", Medieval Jewish Civilization. An Encyclopedia, ed. Norman Roth, 2003;
  Its bibliography:
Buber, Midrash Leqah Tob, Introduction, p. xxiia;
Eliakim Carmoly, in Jost's Annalen, i. 149;
Daniel Chwolson, in the Meqitze Nirdamim Sammelband, 1897, p. 5;
Franz Delitzsch, Zur Gesch. der Jüdischen Poesie, pp. 39 et seq.;
Dukes, Ehrensäulen, p. 7;
Fränkel, in Z. D. M. G. 1. 418 et seq.;
Heinrich Grätz, Gesch. v. 235, 295;
Moritz Güdemann, Gesch. ii. 41;
David de Gunzbourg, in R. E. J. xxxi. 283 et seq.;
Abraham Harkavy, Skuzaniya Yevreiskikh Pisatelei o Khozarakh de, St. Petersburg, 1874;
D. Kaufmann, in Jewish Quarterly Review iii. 512, note;
P. H. Külb, in Ersch and Gruber, Encyc. section ii., part 23, p. 134;
I. Lévi, in R. E. J. xxviii. 147 et seq.;
I. B. Levinsohn, Bet Yehudah, p. 156, Warsaw, 1878;
Lilienblum, in Ha-Meliẓ, xx. 366;Jewish Quarterly Review xi. 355 et seq.;
Azariah dei Rossi, Me'or 'Enayim, p. 866, Mantua, 1574;
Rapoport, Saadia Gaon, note 39;
idem, Eliezer Kalir, p. 102, note 7, and Supplement, p. 13;
idem, Natan ben Yehiel, p. 44;
idem, in Parhon's Aruch, p. x.;
Giovanni Bernardo De Rossi, Annales Hebrœo-Typographici, pp. 114 et seq., Parma, 1795;
Moritz Steinschneider, Jewish, Literature, pp. 77, 335;
idem, Catalogus Bodleiana col. 1547 et seq.;
idem, Hebr. Uebers. p. 898;
idem, Hebr. Bibl. ix. 18 et seq.;
idem, Die Geschichtslitteratur der Juden, pp. 28 et seq.;
idem, in Jewish Quarterly Review xvi. 393;
Trieber, in Nachrichten der Königlichen Gesellschaft der Wissenschaften zu Göttingen, 1895, pp. 381 et seq.;
F. Vogel, De Hegesippo Qui Dicitur Josephi Interprete, Erlangen, 1881;
Hermann Vogelstein and Paul Rieger, Geschichte der Juden in Rom, i. 185 et seq.;
Isaac Hirsch Weiss, Dor, iv. 224, note 5;
Winter and Wünsche, Die, Jüdische, Litteratur, iii. 292 et seq.;
J. Wellhausen, Der Arabische Josippus, in Abhandlungen der Königlichen Gesellschaft der Wissenschaft zu Göttingen, vol. i., Berlin, 1897;
Zunz, Zeitschrift für die Wissenschaft des Judenthums, pp. 304 et seq.;
idem, G. V. pp. 154 et seq.;
idem, Z. G. p. 62, passim;
idem, in Benjamin of Tudela's Itinerary,'' ed. Asher, ii. 246.

10th-century history books
Jewish medieval literature
Hebrew-language literature
Hebrew-language chronicles
Josephus
Jewish Italian history
Ethiopian Orthodox Tewahedo Church
Pseudepigraphy